Urothoides is a genus of amphipod crustaceans, in the family Urothoidae. Members of this genus live at depths from 2.5 to 4564 meters below the surface, with about 202 occurrences.

Species 
Placed by WoRMS.

 Urothoides inops J.L. Barnard, 1967
 Urothoides kurrawa Barnard & Drummond, 1979
 Urothoides lachneessa (Stebbing, 1888)
 Urothoides mabingi Barnard & Drummond, 1979
 Urothoides makoo Barnard & Drummond, 1979
 Urothoides mammarta Barnard & Drummond, 1979
 Urothoides odernae Barnard & Drummond, 1979
 Urothoides pseudodernae Ledoyer, 1984
 Urothoides tondea Barnard & Drummond, 1979
 Urothoides waminoa Barnard & Drummond, 1979

References 

Crustacean genera
Gammaridea